Radim Novák (born 26 March 1973) is a Czech sports shooter. He competed in three events at the 2000 Summer Olympics.

References

1973 births
Living people
Czech male sport shooters
Olympic shooters of the Czech Republic
Shooters at the 2000 Summer Olympics
Sportspeople from Kolín